is a women's volleyball team based in Hiroshima, Hiroshima and Fukuyama, Hiroshima, Japan. It plays in V.League Division 2. The club was founded in 1992 as OSC (Ohno-group Sports Club). The owner of the team is Ohno-group.

History
 1992 - Founded as Ohno oil Sports Club
 1994 - Renamed Ohno oil Hiroshima (Regional League)
 2002 - Won the Regional League
 2003 - Promoted to V.Challenge League 1
 2007 - Nicknamed "Oilers" (Ohno-group Hiroshima Oilers)
 2018 - Promoted to V.League Women Division 2

League results
Official Record

Current squad
2019-20 Squad as of 9 February - 2020

 Head coach:  Hiraku Suzuki (鈴木 輝)

Former players
Yoshiko Ueda
Yurina Inoue
Nanako Senoo
Hiroyo Shigemitsu
 Mari Kuwazane
 Kayoko Kouke
 Megumi Ebihara
 Suzuka Takimoto
 Tomomi Matsui
 Mami Kobara
 Yumi Harukawa
 Norie Sakane
 Akane Matsumoto
 Hikaru Arase
 Ryōko Tanaka

References

External links
 Official Website

Japanese volleyball teams
Volleyball clubs established in 1992